WJNT (1180 AM) is a radio station licensed to Pearl, Mississippi. WJNT is currently owned by Alpha Media through licensee Alpha Media Licensee LLC and its sister stations are WJMI, WKXI-FM, WOAD, WRKS, and WJQS.  All six stations have shared studios which are located in Ridgeland, a suburb of Jackson, while the transmitter tower for WJNT is located in Pearl.

WJNT broadcasts a News/Talk format with mostly syndicated talk shows such as Brian Kilmeade, Mark Levin and Laura Ingraham. WJNT operates at 50,000 Watts during the day, 10,000 Watts during critical hours and 500 Watts at night.

FM signal
WJNT operated at night on WJNT-FM 103.3 until June, 2017.

WJNT was granted permission for the FM booster due to massive nighttime interference by Cuban stations on 1180 AM, and has been operating a nighttime-only FM booster under special temporary authority from the FCC since December 20, 1999. 

Once WJNT-FM1 was turned off, WJNT started simulcasting 24/7 on W245AH, a 135 watt FM translator at 96.9 mHz licensed to Jackson, Mississippi.

External links
http://www.wjnt.com

JNT
News and talk radio stations in the United States
Radio stations established in 1999
Alpha Media radio stations
1999 establishments in Mississippi